WWE 2K14 is a professional wrestling video game developed by Yuke's and published by 2K Sports for the PlayStation 3 and Xbox 360. It was released on October 29, 2013, in North America, October 30, 2013, in Japan, October 31, 2013, in Australia, and November 1, 2013, in Europe and India. The game's box art features The Rock as the cover athlete. 

Succeeding 2012's WWE '13, 2K14 is the first game in the WWE 2K series, and is the first game to be published after Take-Two Interactive gained the license for WWE video games from THQ in a bankruptcy filing. It was also the last video game to use WWE's "scratch" logo that first appeared in the Attitude Era.

The game is succeeded by WWE 2K15 in 2014.

Gameplay 
2K14''' is primarily an update of WWE '13, featuring various changes to modes and mechanics, along with new several features.

 Exhibition 
Improvements have been made to the navigation system, allowing for more fluid walking, running, and dragging motions. Characters also move faster than previously; before running, characters display "starting up" animations, to prevent players from spamming running attacks. All chain reversals now result in offensive attacks, to make for quicker matches by avoiding continuous reversal stalemates. Catapult finishers can now be used offensively. Some characters can launch an opponent into the air and catch them for a catch finisher. Seven new "OMG!" moments have been added, allowing certain finishers to be done on two opponents, and players to interact with the arena environment. The nearfall system has been improved with more than two counts. A "Slobberknocker Mode", adapted from "The Streak" mode, had been added as a gauntlet match.

 Create Suite 
"Create-a-Superstar" now features expanded character save slots for up to 100 created superstars. The mode also introduces the ability to use existing superstars as a template for new custom variants. "Create-a-Championship" has been expanded after being limited in WWE '13.

 Story modes 
 30 Years of WrestleMania WWE 2K14 features a single-player campaign called "The 30 Years of WrestleMania", which recreates nearly three decades of WWE history. Similar to WWE '13's "Attitude Era mode", "30 Years of WrestleMania" spans 45 matches centered around various Superstars, alternate gimmicks, and the use of classic WWE footage across every Wrestlemania event up unto WrestleMania XXIX. The storylines distinctly follow characters who were involved in memorable WrestleMania matches.

In "Wrestlemania mode", matches have primary objectives that are required to be completed; and bonus historical objectives to recreate iconic moments. In some cases, the player will follow a guided sequence of inputs, rather than freely control their character. Storylines featured include; "Hulkamania Runs Wild", which focuses on Hulk Hogan in early WrestleMania events, from the $15,000 Body Slam Challenge between "The Eighth Wonder of the World" Andre the Giant and Big John Studd, with Bobby Heenan by his side, at WrestleMania to Yokozuna (who defeated Bret "The Hitman" Hart earlier ago) VS. Hulk Hogan for the WWE Championship at WrestleMania IX; and "The New Generation", showcasing the rise of Bret "The Hitman" Hart and "The Heartbreak Kid" Shawn Michaels in the mid-1990s, from a ladder match between Razor Ramon and "The Heartbreak Kid" Shawn Michaels, with "Big Daddy Cool" Diesel by his side, for the WWE Intercontinental Championship at Wrestlemania X to a no disqualification submission match between Bret "The Hitman" Hart and "Stone Cold" Steve Austin at WrestleMania 13. In addition, the mode's "Attitude Era" chapter brings back storylines featured in WWE '13s "Attitude Era" mode alongside new storylines, from The Undertaker VS. Kane, with Paul Bearer by his side, at WrestleMania XIV to a no disqualification match between "Stone Cold" Steve Austin and The Rock for the WWE Championship at WrestleMania X-Seven. The "Ruthless Aggression" chapter focuses on the departure of The Rock, lessened focus on "The Game" Triple H and rise of John Cena, from The Rock VS. "Hollywood" Hulk Hogan at WrestleMania X-8 to a triple threat match between John Cena, Triple H and The Rock for the WWE Championship at WrestleMania XXIV. The final "Universe Era" chapter focuses on the rise of "The Apex Predator" Randy Orton and the returns of The Rock and Brock Lesnar, from a triple threat match between "The Rated R Superstar" Edge, John Cena and The Big Show for the World Heavyweight Championship at WrestleMania 25 to The Rock VS. John Cena for the WWE Championship at WrestleMania XXIX.

 "The Streak" 
The game has a mode that focuses on The Undertaker's WrestleMania winning streak of 21 matches at the time of the game's release, from WrestleMania VII, where he defeated Jimmy Snuka, to WrestleMania XXIX, where he defeated CM Punk, before being defeated for the first time by "The Beast Incarnate" Brock Lesnar at Wrestlemania XXX almost six months later. As The Undertaker, the player can battle waves of opponents attempting to break the streak. The player can also select any superstar from the roster and challenge The Undertaker himself at any WrestleMania arena. The difficulty level is higher than in any previous WWE game. The Undertaker can chokeslam the player if grappled at the head; submit the player with the Hell's Gate when The Undertaker is grounded; and can appear once behind the player, in an animation previously used for if the Undertaker interferes in a match if he has a finisher stored.

 WWE Universe 
"WWE Universe" is overhauled, carrying over features from previous games, while introducing new features of its own. The player can customize existing WWE Shows, bring back retired series, or create their own original shows. They can choose the superstars participating in these shows and the titles featured on them. The ability to choose the status of a WWE Superstar, whether assigned to one show, several, a legend, or a free agent is also available. 

A new feature introduced is the Rivalry Manager. Corroborating with an updated statistics tracker, "Rivalry Manager" can track all rivalries as well divide storylines into periods based on dates, during which period the rivalry will continue depending on in-ring decisions. Previous "Universe" storylines from earlier games have been revamped to use the "Rivalry Manager".

 Marketing and release 
Casey Collins, WWE Executive Vice President of Consumer Products, revealed on June 4 at the WWE Global Business Partner Summit, that The Rock would be featured on the cover of WWE 2K14. The official cover and trailer were revealed on the June 24 episode of WWE Raw. 

In July, The Ultimate Warrior was announced as a pre-order exclusive playable character. On August 1, 2K Games announced a special "Phenom Edition" which included Undertaker-themed extras, including the "American Badass" gimmick as a playable character.

 Reception WWE 2K14 received positive reviews, with the Xbox 360 version receiving "generally favorable" reviews", while the PS3 version received "average" reviews from critics, according to review aggregator Metacritic which gave the Xbox 360 version a score of 75/100 based on 42 reviews and the PlayStation 3 version a score of 74/100 based on 21 reviews.

IGN gave the game an 8.7 out of 10 saying "It still lacks the brains to deliver competent AI and commentators, but WWE 2K14 has more than enough brawn to make up for it. 30 Years of Wrestlemania provides the strongest campaign backbone the series has had in a long time, the in-ring action is faster and more fluid than it's been in years, and thanks to WWE 2K14's continually expanding creation suite, we're swimming in more options than we ever knew we wanted. It is indeed "time to play the game". GameSpot rated the game a 6 out of 10, saying that the game was clunky, "It's a shame the wrestling isn't up to par in WWE 2K14 because the elements surrounding it are so interesting... For anyone who grew up loving professional wrestling, be prepared to be swept away in a tide of nostalgia. If only the core action could have been as compelling."

 See also 

List of licensed wrestling video games
List of fighting games
List of video games in the WWE 2K Games seriesWWE 2K''

Notes

References

External links 

2013 video games
2K Sports games
Multiplayer and single-player video games
WWE video games
PlayStation 3 games
Xbox 360 games
Take-Two Interactive games
Video games developed in Japan
Video games developed in the United States
Video games with AI-versus-AI modes
Video games with user-generated gameplay content
Video games with custom soundtrack support
Yuke's games
Video games set in the 1980s
Video games set in the 1990s
Video games set in the 2000s
Video games set in the 2010s
Professional wrestling games
Video games using Havok